Farm to Market Road 1171 (FM 1171) is a farm to market road in Denton County, Texas.

Route description

FM 1171 begins at I-35W in Northlake. In Flower Mound, the road is known as Cross Timbers Road, and it has a junction with US 377. It serves as a major arterial for eastern Flower Mound and Lewisville, where it is known as that city's Main Street. FM 1171 continues through central Lewisville before the designation ends at I-35E; Main Street continues into eastern Lewisville as a four-lane road, which was formerly part of the 1171 designation but was later removed.

History
FM 1171 was first designated on March 30, 1949 from proposed US 77 west  to a county road; at that time, the Lewisville area was undeveloped, and current alignment of  US 77 (now superseded by the Interstate 35E freeway) had yet to be constructed. On June 30, 1955, Loop 187 was combined with the route, extending it eastward to the original route of  SH 121 through eastern Lewisville. FM 1171 was extended westward through Lewisville to US 377 on June 28, 1963, and then to the Interstate 35W freeway on November 5, 1971.

A spur route of FM 1171 existed from August 1, 1963 to May 30, 1990; it connected with mainline FM 1171 east of IH 35E and traveled south along Mill Street to an intersection with SH 121. This mileage was transferred to  FM 3504, which had been cancelled on June 28, 2012 at the request of the city of Lewisville.

On June 27, 1995, the designation of the section east of US 377 to SH 121 was transferred to Urban Road 1171 (UR 1171). On December 18, 2003, the eastern portion, from IH 35E to the former route of SH 121 (now Business SH 121), was removed from the state highway system at the request of the City of Lewisville. The designation of the extant section reverted to FM 1171 with the elimination of the Urban Road system on November 15, 2018.

Major intersections

References

External links

1171
Transportation in Denton County, Texas
Lewisville, Texas